Prosotas lutea or Brown Lineblue is a species of blue (Lycaenidae) butterfly found in Asia.

Range
The butterfly occurs in India from in the Himalayas from Sikkim onto Peninsular Malaysia and Sumatra towards the south and southern Yunnan to the east.

See also
List of butterflies of India (Lycaenidae)

Cited references

References
 
 
 
 
 

lutea
Butterflies of Asia